Ann Marie Yastishock is an American diplomat who is the current nominee to be the next US Ambassador to Papua New Guinea, along with the Solomon Islands and Vanuatu.

Early life and education
Yastishock earned her B.S. in economics from Pennsylvania State University and a J.D. from the Widener University School of Law.

Career
Yastishock is a career member of the Senior Foreign Service, with the rank of Minister-Counselor. She currently serves as Senior Deputy Assistant Administrator in Bureau for Asia, within the United States Agency for International Development (USAID). She previously was the USAID Mission Director in Hanoi, Vietnam. She has also served as the Chief Advisor to the Acting Administrator and Chief Operating Officer for USAID. Before that, she was the Acting Senior Deputy Assistant Administrator of the Bureau for Asia, responsible for USAID missions and programs in East Asia and the Pacific. She oversaw USAID activities in South and Central Asia as the Deputy Assistant Administrator in the Bureau for Asia. Prior assignments in USAID include serving as the Deputy Mission Director for the regional office of USAID covering Ukraine, Moldova, Belarus, and Cyprus; Interim Deputy Mission Director for USAID Burma; deputy director of the USAID Center of Excellence on Democracy, Human Rights and Governance; Senior Legal Advisor to USAID/Afghanistan; and Resident Legal Advisor to Georgia, Armenia, and Azerbaijan. Before her tenure at USAID, Yastishock worked as a Rule of Law Liaison for the American Bar Association/Central and East European Law Initiative with the parliaments of Kazakhstan and Tajikistan.

Ambassador Nomination
On July 11, 2022, President Joe Biden nominated Yastishock to be the next ambassador to Papua New Guinea, serving concurrently as the ambassador to the Solomon Islands and Vanuatu. Her nomination is pending before the Senate Foreign Relations Committee.

Awards and recognitions
Yastishock is the recipient of numerous USAID performance awards.

Personal life
Yastishock is a native of Pennsylvania and speaks Russian.

References

Living people

Year of birth missing (living people)
Pennsylvania State University alumni
Widener University School of Law alumni
American diplomats
United States Foreign Service personnel
21st-century American lawyers
American women diplomats